Las 2 Carolinas is a 2014 Chilean television series, directed and produced by Vicente Sabatini, which aired on Chilevisión from March 2, 2014, to September 12, 2014.

Premise
Carolina Salazar Ibarra (Francisca Lewin) a hard-working young woman from a poor family, she gets a relevant position in the fashion world thanks to being mistaken for a wealthy woman with the same name: Carolina Salazar. This scope of name makes her selected in an elegant boutique run by Sofia Parker (Claudia Di Girolamo), an authoritative boss who thinks she is employing the daughter of one of her friends. However, the brightness, the luxuries and the elegance, dazzle her and tempt her to accept a millionaire contract. Upon learning of the impersonation, the young woman will remain silent so as not to disappoint her family, excited about her new job, and also not to miss this opportunity, since her mother is about to lose the house due to a large number of debts. Thus, she will have to start a double life, certain that at some point she will be able to confess the truth.

Cast

Special participation

References

External links 
  

2014 telenovelas
2014 Chilean television series debuts
Chilean telenovelas
Spanish-language telenovelas
Chilevisión telenovelas